Ray "Gunner" Kelly, MBE, (3 February 1906 – 11 August 1977) was an Australian police officer who was a detective inspector with NSW Police, he became famous during his career owing to his high-profile cases and results, but who was later alleged to have been deeply involved in corruption and organised crime.

Career 
Kelly gained national fame as the head of the investigation into the notorious kidnapping and murder of Sydney schoolboy Graeme Thorne in 1960. Earlier he claimed responsibility for the capture of the notorious Sydney gangster and murderer John 'Chow' Hayes. He gained further renown in 1966 thanks to his highly publicised capture of prison escapees Ronald Ryan and Peter Walker in 1966. However, according to writer Tony Reeves (the biographer of Sydney crime boss Lenny McPherson), Kelly was able to capture the pair easily because they had been betrayed by McPherson. They had come to McPherson seeking his help to leave the country, but McPherson then set up a bogus meeting with Ryan and Walker at Concord Hospital in Sydney and tipped off Kelly.

Kelly often leaked stories to journalist Bill Jenkings of the now-defunct Sydney newspaper The Daily Mirror. He retired in 1966 as the best-known and best-regarded police officer in Sydney. In March 1966, soon after his retirement, Kelly was hired for a private investigation into the disappearance of the Beaumont children by a Sydney newspaper; he flew to Adelaide, where the South Australian Police welcomed him politely, but he left after only one day.

Reputation 
Kelly was also legendary for his prowess in "verballing" alleged criminals. This practice involved coercing verbal confessions from suspects for offences they may not have committed; Kelly used the practice so effectively that barrister (later Justice) Simon Isaacs nicknamed him "Verbal Kelly". Kelly acquired the "Gunner" nickname after two incidents early in his career when he drew his service revolver and fired at suspects. It was his successes as a detective that made his name, however, and his talents were used in situations when particular approaches were warranted. For example, when the British gangster Billy Hill sailed into Sydney with the intention of starting a new life in Australia, Kelly was detailed to ensure that he didn't land. Hill had a legal right to enter the country, so an unorthodox approach was required. Kelly met Hill in his cabin, identified himself, and told Hill that if he stepped off the ship he would return to Britain a week later, in a coffin. Kelly succeeded; Hill stayed on board and returned to Britain, and never tried to visit Australia again.

By the time he died in 1977, however, his reputation had been tarnished by serious corruption allegations, many of which were canvassed in David Hickie's 1985 book The Prince and The Premier. Hickie and others have alleged that Kelly and Detective Fred Krahe were involved in the protection rackets that fed on Sydney's notorious illegal abortion industry. Kelly also made "no secret" of his association with figures such as notorious abortionist Dr Reginald Stuart-Jones, illegal gaming tsars Perc Galea and Joe Taylor and leading Sydney gangsters Charles "Paddles" Anderson and Lenny McPherson. Reeves quoted a former police officer who said that Kelly "ran" McPherson as an informant for many years, According to Reeves, Kelly kept the lid on numerous crimes to reward or gain influence over McPherson and others and learned early in his career that he could exert a powerful influence over criminal activities by setting up underworld killings of criminals who could not be controlled by other means.

Honours 
Kelly was awarded an MBE in 1975 on the advice of controversial NSW Premier Robert Askin. By this time he was reputed to be the part-owner of an illegal casino in Gosford, New South Wales in partnership with the then NSW Police Commissioner Fred Hanson. However, he was later found to be one of the most corrupt police officers in Australia by the 1997 Wood Royal Commission into police corruption, which described Kelly's involvement in the Mr Asia organised crime syndicate.

Death 
Kelly died in Sydney of natural causes on 11 August 1977.

References

1906 births
1977 deaths
Australian police officers
Police detectives
Members of the Order of the British Empire